Juan Daniel Cifuentes Vergara (born 21 April 1999) is a Colombian footballer who plays as a centre-back for club FC Van in the Armenian Premier League.

Club career

América de Cali
Cifuentes started playing football at the football school, Escuela de Fútbol Carlos Sarmiento Lora, in Candelaria, Valle del Cauca. After leaving the school, Cifuentes wanted to retire from football. However, he was convinces to keep playing and soon after, he started at América de Cali. Cifuentes had formerly played as an attacker and a midfielder, but after joining América, he was moved down to the defence.

19-year old Cifuentes got his official debut on 11 November 2018, when he came in as a substitute for Daniel Buitrago in the 85th minute against La Equidad in the Categoría Primera A. This game was his only appearance in the 2018 season. In the 2019 season, Cifuentes was a regular part of the U-20 team and played no professional games.

In 2020, Cifuentes was noted for two appearances in the Categoría Primera A for América, both in January 2020. He made no further appearances in 2020. In 2021, Cifuentes was not a part of América's first team squad. In March 2022, Cifuentes joined Uruguayan Segunda División side Racing Club de Montevideo.

References

External links
 

Living people
1999 births
Colombian footballers
Colombian expatriate footballers
Association football defenders
Sportspeople from Valle del Cauca Department
Categoría Primera A players
Uruguayan Segunda División players
América de Cali footballers
Racing Club de Montevideo players
Colombian expatriate sportspeople in Uruguay
Expatriate footballers in Uruguay